Vermont/Sunset station is an underground rapid transit (known locally as a subway) station on the B Line of the Los Angeles Metro Rail system. It is located under Vermont Avenue at its intersection with Sunset Boulevard, after which the station is named, in the Los Feliz, Silver Lake, and Little Armenia neighborhoods of East Hollywood in Los Angeles.

The intersection of Vermont and Sunset is home to three major area hospitals: Kaiser Permanente Los Angeles Medical Center, Children's Hospital Los Angeles and Hollywood Presbyterian Medical Center.

The station also provides elevator access outside Kaiser Permanente, directly adjacent to and across the street from the main subway station entrance.

Service

Station layout
Vermont/Sunset is a two-story station; the top level is a mezzanine with ticket machines while the bottom is the platform level. The station uses a simple island platform with two tracks.

Hours and frequency

Connections 
, the following connections are available:
 LADOT DASH: Hollywood, Los Feliz, Griffith Observatory Shuttle

Station design

Vermont/Sunset, like many of the B Line stations, was designed by an artist/architect team. For this station, artist Michael Davies collaborated with the architectural firm Diedrich Architects. Their design features iconography that is commonly shared by astronomy and medicine, a nod to the hospitals surrounding the station and the nearby Griffith Park Observatory. The station floor and walls are inlaid with patterns of celestial orbits and microscopic images of life forms. Overhead a star chart maps the earth's placement in the universe. The building that houses the elevator at street level is domed, echoing the design of the observatory.

References

B Line (Los Angeles Metro) stations
East Hollywood, Los Angeles
Railway stations in the United States opened in 1999
1999 establishments in California